Armageddon is a Swedish melodic death metal band, led by Christopher Amott of Arch Enemy.

Biography
Formed in Halmstad, Sweden, in 1997 by Christopher Amott, Armageddon began when Arch Enemy were invited to Japan to sign a new record deal with Toy's Factory records after the release of the Black Earth album.  While in Japan, Christopher secured his own record deal for a solo project, which became Armageddon.  When he returned to Sweden, he recruited drummer Peter Wildoer (Darkane, Majestic), bassist Martin Bengtsson, and vocalist Jonas Nyrén (In Thy Dreams).

The band released their 1997 debut album, Crossing the Rubicon, on the now defunct W.A.R. records in Europe, and on Toy's Factory Records in Japan. Crossing the Rubicon focused primarily on melodic death metal, but incorporated instrumentals and special effects pieces between each song. The album was released by the same label that released Arch Enemy's first album in Europe, but it folded soon after the release of Rubicon and the album has since become a rare find. To this day, Crossing the Rubicon has never been released outside of Europe and Japan.

Following Crossing the Rubicon, Peter Wildoer and Martin Bengtsson both joined Arch Enemy, recording and releasing Stigmata in 1998. Christopher would focus on Arch Enemy for the better part of three years, and did not return to Armageddon until 2000's Embrace the Mystery, released in Japan on Toy's Factory records. The album featured Last Tribe members Rickard Bengtsson on vocals and Dick Lövgren on bass (also of Meshuggah), as well as Arch Enemy's new drummer Daniel Erlandsson (In Flames, Eucharist). 

In 2002, Armageddon resurfaced with Three, this time as a three-piece band, and featuring the vocals of Christopher Amott and new bassist Tobias Gustafsson (of Eucharist). Almost a pure power metal effort, the album was again released by Toy's Factory, and only in Japan. 

On 16 November 2009, Embrace the Mystery and Three were re-released as 2CD  set with upgraded artwork, several bonus tracks and liner notes on 16 November 2009 in Europe and on 26 January in North America via Century Media Records.

In 2012, Christopher Amott once again quit Arch Enemy, and reformed Armageddon once again, featuring Matt Vicklund of God Forbid on guitars and Van Williams of Nevermore on drums.

In January 2015, the band announced Nightrage vocalist Antony Hämäläinen as their replacement for the recently departed Matt Hallquist.

On 25 May 2016, the band announced via their social media "We are happy to announce that the next Armageddon release will be a re-recording of the very first Armageddon album from 1997 entitled 'Crossing The Rubicon'.We are excited to share this news with you!"

As Amott was not able to commit time to Armageddon, in 2019, former members Hämäläinen, Concepcion, Claudius, Pevny and drummer Yanni Sofianos have formed Daughter Chaos, a band intended to be a spiritual successor of Armageddon. 

Band members
Current members
 Christopher Amott – guitars, backing vocals 
 Joey Concepcion – guitars 
 Márton Veress – drums 
 Antony Hämäläinen – lead vocals 
 Andrew Pevny – bass 

Former members
 Jonas Nyrén – vocals 
 Martin Bengtsson – bass 
 Peter Wildoer – drums 
 Rickard Bengtsson – vocals 
 Dick Lövgren – bass 
 Daniel Erlandsson – drums 
 Tobias Gustafsson – bass 
 Matt Wicklund – guitar (
 Van Williams – drums 
 Matt Hallquist – vocals 
 Sara Claudius – bass 

Timeline

Discography
Studio albumsCrossing the Rubicon (1997)Embrace the Mystery (2000)Three (2002)Captivity & Devourment (2015)Crossing the Rubicon (Revisited)'' (2016)

References

External links
 The official Armageddon Myspace page

Swedish melodic death metal musical groups
Swedish power metal musical groups
Swedish thrash metal musical groups
Musical groups established in 1997
Musical groups disestablished in 2002
Listenable Records artists
Toy's Factory artists